Billy Hurley may refer to:

 Billy Hurley III (born 1982), American golfer
 Billy Hurley (footballer) (born 1959), English former footballer

See also
William Hurley (disambiguation)